Mariya Aleksandrovna Fomina (born 1 March 1993) is a Russian theater and film actress.

Early life
Mariya Fomina was born in Moscow, Russia. From an early age she was engaged in choreography and ballet - she dreamed of becoming a ballerina. With the children, Mariya was engaged in ballet at the Moscow State Academy of Choreography.

Also in school years was fond of diving. When Mariya was 11 years old, she was casting for the film Daddy (2004) by Vladimir Mashkov and Mariya's father advised her to try for an episodic role. And she did it. After the first shooting experience, she firmly decided to become an actress.

Since 2004, she studied at Irina Feofanova's children's theater studio in Igor Yatsko's group. In the senior classes I studied at the preparatory courses of the Moscow Art Theatre School.

In 2010, entered the Russian Academy of Theatre Arts - GITIS, which she graduated in 2014, the workshop of Oleg Kudryashov. While studying at RATI-GITIS she played in the productions: "The Village of Peremilovo"; "Eugene Onegin"; "AURORA"; "What`s the buzz"; "AT. OL K" (Here She is Love What); "IU and YES"; "Love story".

From 2014 to 2016 she played at the Theatre of Nations, among her works: "#soneetsekspira" directed by T. Kulyabin; "Yvonne, Princess of Burgundy" director G. Yazhin.

Since 2016 - an actress in the internship group of the Moscow Art Theater named after A. Chekhov, was engaged in performances: Elizabeth II "Jubilee of the Jeweler" director O. Tabakov and K. Bogomolov; Matilda - "North Wind" director R. Litvinov.

Was filmed for covers of glossy magazines, such as OOPS !, Cosmopolitan, Glamour, Mini, Maxim, SNC. She was filmed in the video of the band Stigmata - "Up to 9 steps", "Bi-2" - "Compromise", "Ligalaise" - "I'll tell you", as well as in Pepsi, "No-shpa", Montale, in the screen saver channel TNT, in the promo version of the model agency President. Was an official of Vassa & Co.

Career
As mentioned above, the debut on the screen took place in 2004 with a small role in the film Daddy. Also in school years Mariya was lit in several more tapes: Potapov, to the board! (2007), My team (2007).

In 2010, she played a prominent role in the series Day of despair by Vladimir Chubrikov. Her first major role was performed in 2014 in the horror film Block 18.

Also the main role went to the actress in the fantastic tragicomedy of Vladimir Shevelkov What the French Don't Talk About.

Personal life
Between 2015 and 2016, she was in a relationship with Russian actor Pavel Tabakov.

In 2018 she married film producer and businessman Alexei Kiselyov, who is also the son of Russian and Ukrainian TV presenter Yevgeny Kiselyov. On 15 August 2018, she gave birth to a daughter, who was named Anna.

Filmography

Films

TV Series

References

External links

1993 births
Living people
Russian child actresses
Russian film actresses
Russian television actresses
Russian stage actresses
21st-century Russian actresses
Actresses from Moscow